The Apache are a group of culturally related Native American tribes.

Apache, Apaches or The Apache may also refer to:

Arts and entertainment

Film and television
 Apache (film), a 1954 western film starring Burt Lancaster
 The Apache (1925 film), a British silent drama film directed by and starring Adelqui Migliar
 The Apache (1928 film), an American silent mystery film directed by Phil Rosen 
 Apaches (film), a 1977 British public information film
 Apaches (TV series), a 2017 Spanish drama television series

Literature
 Apache (novel), by Will Levington Comfort, 1931
 Apaches, a 1997 novel by Lorenzo Carcaterra

Music and dance 
 Apache (dance), a form of dance in the 1920s
 Apache (dance move) more commonly known as "Texas Tommy", a dance move used in Lindy Hop, West Coast Swing, and Salsa
 "Apache" (instrumental), a 1960 instrumental by Jerry Lordan, performed by the Shadows, and sampled in hip-hop
 Apache (album), by Link Wray, 1990

Other uses in arts and entertainment 
 Apache (video game), 1995
 Les Apaches, a group of musicians, writers and artists which formed around 1900 in Paris, France

Businesses and organizations
 Apache Corporation, an American oil and gas company 
 The Apache Software Foundation, an American non-profit corporation to support Apache software projects
 Apache HTTP Server, a free and open-source cross-platform web server
 Apache License, a permissive free software license 
 Apache Group, dissenting faction of the 1990s Advanced Computing Environment

Military 
 Boeing AH-64 Apache, an American twin-turboshaft attack helicopter 
 AgustaWestland Apache, a version built for the British Army
 Apache (missile), an air-launched anti-runway cruise missile, manufactured by MBDA
 North American A-36 Apache, the ground-attack/dive bomber version of the P-51 Mustang
 USS Apache, the name of several ships of the U.S. Navy

People
 Apache (rapper), Anthony Peaks (1964–2010), an American rapper
 Apache 207, a German rapper
 Apache (Viet Cong soldier), a sniper and platoon commander killed by Carlos Hathcock
 El Apache, nickname for Argentine footballer Carlos Tevez (born 1984)
 Apache Indian, Steven Kapur (born 1967), a British singer-songwriter and DJ

Places in the United States 
 Apache, Oklahoma
 Apache County, Arizona

Science and technology

 Apache (planthopper), a genus of planthoppers in the family Derbidae
 Apache, a sweet potato cultivar
 APACHE II and III, severity-of-disease classification systems
 HTC Apache, a mobile device

Sports and mascots 
 Laredo Apaches, a defunct baseball team in Laredo, Texas, United States
 Tokyo Apache, a Japanese basketball team
 Apache, the mascot of Arcadia High School (California)

Transportation
 Chevrolet Apache, a light truck
 Piper PA-23, named Apache, a light aircraft
 TVS Apache, a motorcycle

Other uses 
 Apaches (subculture), a Parisian Belle Époque violent criminal underworld subculture
 Apache revolver, a handgun

See also 

 Fort Apache (disambiguation)
 The Apache Kid (disambiguation)
 Southern Athabaskan languages, or Apachean, languages spoken by various groups of Apache and Navajo peoples